Michael Kraus may refer to:

 Michael Kraus (soccer) (born 1984), American soccer player
 Michael Kraus (field hockey) (born 1958), American Olympic hockey player
 Michael Kraus (handballer) (born 1983), German handball player
 Michael Kraus (minister) (1908–2003), Canadian entrepreneur and minister
 Michael Kraus (swimmer) (born 1955), German former swimmer
 Michael Kraus (baritone) (born 1957), Austrian operatic baritone

See also
Michael Krauss (disambiguation)